Tan Sri Syed Mokhtar Shah bin Syed Nor Albukhary (born 12 December 1951) is a Malaysian businessman, entrepreneur and philanthropist. He is the founder of the Albukhary Foundation, an international non-profit charity organization that focuses on social development.

Early life
Syed Mokhtar Albukhary was born on 12 December 1951, the third child of Syed Nor and Sharifah Rokiah in Kampung Hutan Keriang, Alor Setar, Kedah. His family traces its roots to Hadramawt region of Yemen.

In 1961, Syed Mokhtar moved to Johor Bahru where he spent the next 6 years before returning to Alor Setar where he attended St. Michael's Secondary School. While still schooling, he got involved in his father's cattle business.

Not long after, an outbreak of Foot-and-mouth disease collapsed the company. This led to Syed Mokhtar abandoning his studies a few months prior to completing his Secondary 5, as his family could not afford to pay for his examination fees.
With money saved from his involvement in his father's cattle business, Syed Mokhtar began venturing into business on his own.

Career
The Albukhary Group of Companies is a diversified business group consisting of DRB-HICOM, MMC and Tradewinds Plantation.

In May 2020, Malaysia's Ministry of Communications and Multimedia awarded the highly lucrative 5G telecommunications spectrum contract to a company called ALTEL, a subsidiary of Puncak Semangat, a firm primarily controlled by Malaysian tycoon Tan Sri Syed Mokhtar AlBukhary.

Philanthropy
Syed Mokhtar began his philanthropic work in 1976 when he pledged half of his salary to 15 underprivileged families and the other half to his mother and siblings. Twenty years later, in 1996, he founded the Albukhary Foundation and today remains its primary benefactor. As of 2013 his donations have exceeded $500 million. In 2014 he was recognized by Forbes Asia as a Hero of Philanthropy due to his contribution to refugees in Pakistan, orphans in Guinea and disaster victims in China, Indonesia] and Iran.

The Albukhary Foundation
The Albukhary Foundation is an international non-profit charitable organization headquartered in Malaysia which was founded on the Islamic values of faith (Taqwa) and compassion (Ehsan). Since it is founded on Islamic values, the foundation does not discriminate on the grounds of race, nationality, ethnic origin and religion.

Albukhary International University (AiU)

The Albukhary International University was founded in 2010 and is located within the Sharifah Rokiah Centre of Excellence.

Islamic Arts Museum Malaysia
The museum was founded in 1998 and is located within Kuala Lumpur's Lake Gardens. It houses more than ten thousand artefacts from across the Muslim world, as well as a library of Islamic art books. The museum has a total of 12 galleries.

The museum has won a number of domestic and international awards and is one of the most visited museums in Malaysia.

In 2015, the British Museum announced the opening of a new gallery to redisplay all the collections of the Islamic world. The gallery would be known as The Albukhary Foundation Gallery of the Islamic World and is set to open in October 2018.

Albukhary Scholarship Program
Founded in 2005, Albukhary Scholarship program supports economically disadvantaged students worldwide. The scholarships are offered to students of the Prince's School of Traditional Arts, Oxford University, IBN Haldun University, University of York, Philanthropy University and 17 universities in Malaysia, including AIU. The program offers five types of scholarships, the Albukhary Equity Scholarship, Regional Awards, Leadership, Academic & Service Excellence Awards, Campus Residence Grant, and the Refugee Education Dream (RED) Scholarship which is available to all refugees and asylum seekers registered with UNHCR Malaysia.

Honours
  :
  Commander of the Order of Meritorious Service (PJN) - Datuk (1997)
  Commander of the Order of Loyalty to the Crown of Malaysia (PSM) - Tan Sri (2000)

  :
  Knight Grand Companion of the Order of Loyalty to the Royal House of Kedah (SSDK) - Dato' Seri (2008)
  :
  Knight Commander of the Exalted Order of Malacca (DCSM) - Datuk Wira (2010)

References

Malaysian businesspeople
Malaysian people of Malay descent
Malaysian billionaires
1951 births
Living people
Hadhrami people
People from Alor Setar
Malaysian philanthropists
Malaysian people of Yemeni descent
Malaysian chairpersons of corporations
Commanders of the Order of Loyalty to the Crown of Malaysia
Commanders of the Order of Meritorious Service